{{DISPLAYTITLE:C13H14N2O2}}
The molecular formula C13H14N2O2 (molar mass: 230.26 g/mol, exact mass: 230.1055 u) may refer to:

 Batoprazine
 Metomidate

Molecular formulas